Poplar was a constituency used for elections to the London County Council between 1889 and 1919, and again between 1949 and the council's abolition, in 1965.  The seat shared boundaries with the UK Parliament constituency of the same name.

Councillors

Election results

1889 to 1919

1949 to 1965

References

London County Council constituencies
Politics of the London Borough of Tower Hamlets
Poplar, London